Eurema sarilata is a coliadine butterfly endemic to the Philippines.

Subspecies
E. s. sarilata (North Philippines and Central Philippines)
E. s. mindorana (Butler, 1898) (Philippines: Mindoro)
E. s. perplexa Shirôzu & Yata, 1982 (Philippines: Basilan)
E. s. aquilo Shirôzu & Yata, 1982 (Philippines: Luzon)
E. s. risa Morishita, 1982 (Philippines: Negros)
E. s. sibuyanensis Yata & Treadaway, 1982 (Sibuyan Island)

References

External links
 Images representing Eurema sarilata at Encyclopedia of Life

sarilata
Butterflies described in 1891
Butterflies of Asia